The OM616 engine family is a diesel automobile Inline-four engine from Mercedes-Benz used in the 1970s and 1980s, and produced by Force Motors in India from the 1980s to the present.

This engine was used in various cars, vans and Unimogs over its production lifetime, and still finds use in Force Motors SUVs.

The abbreviation ¨OM¨ stands for ¨Oel-Motor¨ (Oil Motor), which refers to the fact that it runs on oil. This method of naming is still used on Mercedes-Benz diesel engines today.

Power update
In August 1978 the precombustion chamber was updated for more swirl and more efficient combustion. The new camshaft pushes the valves deeper so the air and exhaust gases have less resistance.
A similar technique power update around these time was also done on the OM615 and OM617.

Applications
 OM616.912 
 1976-1978 W123 (240D)
 OM616.916 
 1973-1976 W115 (240D)
 1976-1985 W123 (240D)
 OM616.936 
 TN
 G-Class
 OM616.937 
 TN

For exchange engine purposes
Later, more powerful versions of the OM616 are interchangeable with early ones. This is done with many older transporter vans and campers like the 207D and 307D models. It is not possible to change only the cylinder head for one with the higher rating, since the higher valve lift of the later versions will interfere with the early pistons.
It is possible to change to a more powerful straight-five OM617 but modifications to engine mounts, the hood, and other underhood components (notably the radiator and cooling fan) are necessary.

The OM616 in India
In 1982, Bajaj Tempo, now Force Motors, signed a deal with Daimler Benz to manufacture the OM616 Mercedes engine under licence in India for fitting on its line of vehicles. This Mercedes engine gave the company a technological edge over other Indian manufacturers leading to the success of several Bajaj Tempo models.

The Mercedes OM 616 or its variants still power the light commercial vehicles of Bajaj Tempo, including the Tempo Traveller, the new Excel series of trucks and the Trax range of multi-utility vehicles. At present, Force Motors is also assembling other Mercedes engines and supplying it to Mercedes Benz India Ltd. 

The Bajaj Tempo OM616 engine is configured for different power outputs depending on the intended usage, from a  version, to the  Turbocharged version used in the Trax Gurkha (Which is superficially similar to the Geländewagen design).

Specs of the OM616 used in the Trax SUV:
Model OM - 616(D-98)
Type 4 Cylinder, 4-Stroke, IDI
Bore/Stroke 
Displacement 
Compression Ratio 21.0:1
Max. Power output  (ISO) at 4000 RPM
Max. Torque  @ 1800-2000 RPM
Air filter Oil Bath Type
Oil filter Bye pass flow type paper filter
Fuel filter Dual filter
Oil sump capacity

See also

 List of Mercedes-Benz engines

References

OM616
Diesel engines by model

es:Mercedes-Benz OM 621-OM 615-OM 616
it:Mercedes-Benz OM615#OM616
Straight-four engines